Cristina Fernández (born 24 July 1974) is a Spanish sports shooter. She competed in the women's 10 metre air rifle event at the 1992 Summer Olympics.

References

1974 births
Living people
Spanish female sport shooters
Olympic shooters of Spain
Shooters at the 1992 Summer Olympics
Place of birth missing (living people)